Thomas Stokeley Wilson (October 13, 1813 – May 16, 1894) was a judge and attorney from Iowa. Born in Steubenville, Ohio, he graduated from Jefferson College (now Washington & Jefferson College) in 1833. He served in the Iowa House of Representatives 1866 and 1868 as a Democrat.
He was a Judge of the Supreme Court of Iowa Territory 1838-1839 and Judge of the Iowa Supreme Court from December 28, 1846, to October 31, 1847, appointed from Dubuque County, Iowa, and Iowa District Court judge 1852–1863. He died in Dubuque, Iowa.

External links

References

Iowa lawyers
Democratic Party members of the Iowa House of Representatives
Justices of the Iowa Supreme Court
Iowa state court judges
Washington & Jefferson College alumni
Politicians from Steubenville, Ohio
1813 births
1894 deaths
19th-century American politicians
19th-century American judges
19th-century American lawyers